Penicillium tropicum is a species of fungus in the genus Penicillium which was isolated from soil beneath a Coffea arabica plant in Karnataka in India.

References

Further reading 
 

tropicum
Fungi described in 2010